There are several conjectures in mathematics by David Mumford.
 Mumford's conjecture about reductive groups, now called Haboush's theorem.
 The Mumford conjecture on the cohomology of the stable mapping class group, proved by Ib Madsen and Michael Weiss.
 The Manin-Mumford conjecture about Jacobians of curves, proved by Michel Raynaud.